The Netherlands Football League Championship 1888–1889 was the first national football championship in the Netherlands. Seven teams from the cities Amsterdam, The Hague, Haarlem and Rotterdam participated in the competition that would later be called Eerste Klasse West. But since the western football district of the Netherlands was the only one to have a competition at the time, it could be regarded as a national championship. VV Concordia from Rotterdam won the championship, however this championship was not official, since the teams had not played an equal number of matches.

League standings

Results

References

RSSSF Netherlands Football League Championships 1898-1954

Netherlands Football League Championship seasons
1888–89 in European football